You You (June 23, 1988 - March 2004) was a male giant panda born by artificial insemination in the Ueno Zoo in Japan. His parents are Fei Fei and Huan Huan. 

In 1992, to commemorate the 20th anniversary of the Normalization of Sino-Japan Diplomatic Relations, the Ueno Zoo exchanged You You with Ling Ling from the Beijing Zoo, and You You thus came to settle in the Beijing Zoo.

In March 2004, You You died at the Beijing Zoo in China.

See also
 Ling Ling
 Panda diplomacy

References

1988 animal births
2004 animal deaths
Individual giant pandas
Individual animals in Japan